Leiria is a city and municipality in the Central Region of Portugal. It is the seat of its own district and the Roman Catholic Diocese of Leiria-Fátima. The city is part of the historical province of Beira Litoral.

History

The region around Leiria has long been inhabited although its early history is obscure. The first evident inhabitants were the Turduli Oppidani, a Celtici tribe (akin to the Lusitanians), who established a settlement near (around 7 km) present-day Leiria. This settlement was later occupied by the Romans, who expanded it under the original Celtiberian name Collippo. The stones of the ancient Roman town were used in the Middle Ages to build much of Leiria.

The name "Leiria" in Portuguese derives from 'leira' (from the medieval Galician-Portuguese form 'laria', from proto-Celtic *ɸlār-yo-, 'high<->ground'/'yon<->floor' akin to English 'floor(ing)', Old Irish 'làr' 'ground, floor', Breton 'leur' 'ground', Welsh 'llawr' 'floor') meaning an area with small farming plots.
It was occupied by the Suebi in 414 until they were forced by the Romans to retreat to Galicia and later incorporated by Leovigild into the Visigoths kingdom in 585 A.D.
Later the Moors occupied the area until it was re-captured by the first King of Portugal, Afonso Henriques in 1135, during the Reconquista.  

South of Leiria in that period was the so-called "no-man's land", until regions further south (like Santarém and Lisbon) were permanently taken and re-populated by the Christians. In 1142 Afonso Henriques gave Leiria its first foral (compilation of feudal rights) to stimulate the colonisation of the region.

Both Afonso I of Portugal and Sancho I rebuilt the walls and the Leiria Castle to avoid new enemy incursions. Most of the population lived inside the protective city walls, but already in the 12th century part of the population lived outside the walls. The oldest church of Leiria, the Church of Saint Peter (Igreja de São Pedro), built in romanesque style in the last quarter of the 12th century, served the parish located outside the walls.

During the Middle Ages the importance of the village increased, and it was the setting of several cortes (feudal parliaments). The first of the cortes held in Leiria took place in 1245, under King Afonso II. In the early 14th century, the king restored the keep tower of the citadel of the castle, as can be seen in an inscription in the tower. He also built a royal residence in Leiria (now lost), and lived for long periods in the town, which he donated as feud to his wife, Elizabeth of Portugal (Rainha Isabel). 

The king also ordered the plantation of the famous Pine Forest of Leiria (Pinhal de Leiria) near the coast. Later, the wood from this forest would be used to build the ships used in the Portuguese Navigations of the 15th and 16th centuries.

In the late 14th century, King John I built a royal palace within the walls of the castle of Leiria. This palace, with elegant gothic galleries that offered wonderful views of the town and surrounding landscape, was totally in ruins but was partially rebuilt in the 20th century. 

John I also sponsored the rebuilding in late gothic style of the old Church of Our Lady of the Rock (Igreja de Nossa Senhora da Pedra), located inside the castle.

Towards the end of the 15th century the town continued to grow, occupying the area from the castle hill down to the river Lis. King Manuel I gave it a new foral in 1510, and, in 1545, it was elevated to the category of city and became see of a diocese. 

The Cathedral of Leiria was built in the second half of the 16th century in a mix of late manueline and mannerist styles.

Compared to the Middle Ages, the subsequent history of Leiria is of relative decay. The city was stormed by the Peninsular War, namely in the French Invasions of 1808 (the killing of Portela, by the troops of Gen. Margaron) and the Great Fire of 1811, caused by the Napoleonic troops retreating from the Lines of Torres Vedras.

In the 20th century, however, its strategic position in the Portuguese territory favoured the development of a diversified industry.

Geography

Leiria is located in western Central Portugal. The municipality borders the Atlantic Ocean to the northwest, Marinha Grande to the west, Alcobaça to the southwest, Batalha to the south, Ourém to the southeast, and Pombal to the north and northeast. The city is located about halfway between Lisbon and Porto. The historic city centre spreads between the castle hill and the river Lis.

Leiria is also the seat of its own sub-region, Região de Leiria, which includes the cities of Marinha Grande, Pombal as well the municipalities/town seats of Batalha, Alcobaça and Porto de Mós located nearby.

Climate
The city of Leiria has a Mediterranean climate (Köppen: Csb) with warm, dry summers and mild, wet winters. Its location near the Atlantic coast keeps temperature variation relatively minimal.

Winters are mild and wet. On average, around 50% of the days receive some form of precipitation in this season.

Springs are pleasant, but usually rainy during the month of April. This season, though wet, is slightly dryer than winter, with the majority of days receiving no precipitation.

Summers bring high temperatures and sunshine. Precipitation, when present, mostly occurs in the form of drizzle, and accounts for only around 20% of days between June and September. Sunshine hours reach their maximum in August (which is sunny 70% of the time).

Autumn, although mild, is the rainiest season of the year.

Snowfalls in the city of Leiria typically occur once every 20 to 30 years.

Parishes
Administratively, the municipality is divided into 18 civil parishes (freguesias):

 Amor
 Arrabal
 Bajouca
 Bidoeira de Cima
 Caranguejeira
 Coimbrão
 Colmeias e Memória
 Leiria, Pousos, Barreira e Cortes
 Maceira
 Marrazes e Barosa
 Milagres
 Monte Real e Carvide
 Monte Redondo e Carreira
 Parceiros e Azoia
 Regueira de Pontes
 Santa Catarina da Serra e Chainça
 Santa Eufémia e Boa Vista
 Souto da Carpalhosa e Ortigosa

Demographics

Culture
In addition to being a site of historical interest, the castle of Leiria provides a venue for cultural events. Nearby is the Church of Saint Peter (Igreja de São Pedro), the site of the city's annual music festival. Leiria is home to the Museu da imagem em movimento (Museum of the Moving Image) as well as Portugal's restored first paper mill, Moinho do Papel (The Paper Mill), the Theatre Miguel Franco in the Mercado de Sant'Ana (Saint Anne's Market) and the Theatre José Lúcio da Silva are venues for theatrical, musical, cinematic and dance performances.

Today the central square, Praça Francisco Rodrigues Lobo, named after the Portuguese poet Francisco Rodrigues Lobo, is home to a thriving café culture, regularly used for cultural events. The city was the principal residence of the Portuguese king, Denis, who wrote lyric poetry in the troubadour tradition, and briefly the home of the modern realist writer Eça de Queiroz, whose first novel, O Crime do Padre Amaro ("Father Amaro's Sin"), published in 1875, is set in the city.

In October 2012, Leiria opened the city's "Centro Cívico", a modern architecture building, designed to have social impact on the community. This building has the life of Eça de Queiroz as a theme. In here, there's senior classes and Associação Fazer Avançar runs SPEAK, with support from EDP and Calouste Gulbenkian Foundation, among others.

The city has several cultural entities like Leiria's Public Library Afonso Lopes Vieira, Arquivo, Ateneu, Leirena and O Nariz (theatre groups), Associação Fazer Avançar, FADE IN, Metamorfose, ECO and many others which make Leiria a culturally vibrant city, offering the busiest calendars of events.

In recent years, Leiria has seen much redevelopment on the banks of the Lis River, with the creation of several new parks, public spaces, children's play areas, skateboard parks and a series of themed bridges. A long riverside promenade was built which is popular with walkers and joggers.

Since 2010, Associação FADE IN organizes ENTREMURALHAS, one of the most important gothic festivals in the world (List of gothic festivals).

Gastronomy

Leiria's gastronomy offers a good variety of Portuguese dishes including fresh fish dishes and the famous "Leitão" da Boavista (barbecued piglet/ suckling pig). 
The nearby village of Cortes is known for "Migas", a dish of corn bread with spinach, garlic and olive oil which is eaten as an accompaniment to fish or meat.

Typical Dishes: Morcela de Arroz; Lentriscas; Bacalhoada com migas; Bacalhau com feijão frade; Ossinhos; Fritada; Cabrito; Feijoada; Leitão; Chanfana; Fritada dos peixinhos; Bacalhau com Chícharos.

Traditional sweet pastry: Brisas do Lis; Lampreia de Ovos; Ovos Folhados; Bolinhos de Pinhão; Tarte de Chícharos (Alvaiázere); Canudos de Leiria; Doce de amêndoa; Broas Doces de Batata; Merendeiras dos Santos; Filhós de abóbora.

Wines of the region: Caves Vidigal, S.A./ Vale da Mata, Cortes / Quinta da Serrinha (Vin Bio), Barreira / Santos & Santos, Torres Vedras / Quinta da Sapeira, Serra d'Aire / Paço Côrtes, Lda. IGP Lisboa, Sub-região Alta Estremadura. These wines are labeled D.O.C. (Denominação de Origem Controlada) which secures a superior quality. Also parte of the Portuguese wine region Encostas de Aire (DOC).

Panoramic view

Economy
Leiria has an economy concentrated on services and light industries. It has several industries related with plastics and moulds, as well as animal food, milling, cement, and civil construction, among other light industries. Agriculture, tourism, and state-run public services, such as education (including the Polytechnical Institute of Leiria), health (the district hospital Hospital de Santo André) and general public administration, are an important part of Leiria's economy.

Monte Real Air Base, a major Military airbase of the Portuguese Air Force in Monte Real, where all Portuguese F16 fighter squadrons are stationed, is also notable employer in the region.

Transport
Leiria is connected to its suburbs and the rest of Portugal by a motorway network. There are four motorways passing the city; 
 A1 - Auto-estrada do Norte linking Porto to Lisbon, passing by Leiria.
 A8 linking Leiria to Lisbon.
 A17 linking Marinha Grande to Aveiro. 
 A19, linking Leiria and Batalha, using part of the IC2.

There is a railway Linha do Oeste (west railway line linking Cacém (Sintra/Lisbon area) to Figueira da Foz) which serves the central western coast of Portugal. Leiria railway station is a few km from the city centre (about 2 km).

The main bus station service is in the city centre. The bus service, called Mobilis, is composed by 9 lines connecting surrounding neighbourhoods and parishes of Leiria with the city centre. This includes two bus loops and a specific line (uMob) that connects the city centre with Campus 1 and 2 of the Instituto Politécnico de Leiria.

There is a small airfield (Aérodromo José Ferrinho), used for sports and recreation.

Leiria-based newspapers

 Região de Leiria – Weekly
 Jornal de Leiria – Weekly
 Diário de Leiria – Daily
 O Mensageiro – Monthly - closed

Education
Leiria hosts a national public polytechnic institution of higher education, the Instituto Politécnico de Leiria which has 5 campuses, 3 of them located in Leiria.
 Campus 1 - School of Education and Social Sciences (ESECS).
 Campus 2 - School of Technology and Management (ESTG) and the School Of Health Sciences (ESS)
 Campus 5 - Institute for Research, Development and Advanced Studies (INDEA), the Training Centre for the Courses of Technology Specialization (FOR.CET) with around 900 students, the Centre of New Opportunities (CNO), a Transfer Technology and Information Center (OTIC) and an E-Learning Unit (UED).
There is also a private institution, o Instituto Superior de Línguas e Administração (ISLA). 
 
In Secondary education, Leiria has the following schools, the first two in the center, the last in the outskirts.
 Escola Secundária de Francisco Rodrigues Lobo (former Liceu)
 Escola Secundária de Domingos Sequeira (former Escola Comercial)
 Escola Secundária de Afonso Lopes Vieira, in Gândara dos Olivais, Marrazes.

In Primary education, Leiria has the following schools, teaching from the 5th grade until 9th grade. 
 Escola D. Dinis 
 Escola Correia Mateus (with 1st cycle) 
 Escola José Saraiva
 Escola de Marrazes 
 Colégio Dinis de Melo 
 Colégio Senhor dos Milagres 
Besides this there are multiple schools in the Municipality for the 1st cycle, from 1st grade until 4th grade.

Sport

The city of Leiria has its own football team, the União Desportiva de Leiria, commonly called just União de Leiria. It currently plays at the third level of Portuguese football, in Liga 3, but recently spent 16 seasons in the Primeira Liga.

An important facility is the Estádio Dr. Magalhães Pessoa, situated close to Leiria castle. The modern stadium has a capacity for 23,000 people and was built for the UEFA Euro 2004. Efforts were made to sell it, as its debt (nearly €50M) overburdens the city finances,  União de Leiria rents the stadium, but played the 2011-12 season in Estádio Municipal da Marinha Grande due to a rent dispute.

The district football in Leiria is managed by the Leiria Football Association, overseeing the regional leagues.

Regarding other sports, Leiria has a notable women's handball team, Juve Lis, which plays in the Women's Handball League, and also participated in EHF competitions. Since 2013 Leiria has had a chess academy (Academia de Xadrez) offered as an activity for young people by the Corvos do Lis. Enrolled students have won titles in National Competitions: second place by teams under 12 years old in 2014 and 2015 and a National Champion, (Blitz, 2013, Under 8) and (Super Rapid play, 2015, under 10). They work with many primary schools in the region teaching chess, considering it a useful complement to developing intellectual skills.

Leiria also holds other facilities that can host different sport activities. They are Campo Futebol Aldeia do Desporto, Centro Nacional de Lançamentos, Pavilhão Gimnodesportivo dos Pousos (and adjacent Campo da Charneca), and Pavilhão do Lis. The latter was recognized by the Portuguese Paralympic Committee has the first paralympic inclusive venue of its kind in Portugal.

Leiria was chosen as one of the European Cities of Sport in 2022.

International relations

According to the National Association of Portuguese Municipalities, Leiria is twinned with:

 Tokushima, Japan (since 1969)
 Setúbal, Portugal (since 1982)
 Saint-Maur-des-Fossés, France (since 1982)
 Maringá, Brazil (since 1982)
 Olivenza, Spain (since 1984)
 Olavarría, Argentina (since 1992)
 São Filipe, Cape Verde (since 1994)
 Rheine, Germany (since 1996)
 Halton, United Kingdom (since 1997)
 Tongling, China (since 1999)
 Nampula, Mozambique (since 2002)
 Quint-Fonsegrives, France (since 2010)
 Penglai, China (since 2014)

Notable people 

 Francisco Rodrigues Lobo (1580–1622), the Portuguese Theocritus, a poet and bucolic writer.
 Adriano Sousa Lopes (1879-1944), a Portuguese modernist painter and engraver
 Lino António (1898–1974), an artist using modernist frescoes, he made many friezes, frescos, stained glass and ceramic panels for public buildings
 Fabricio Soares (1918-1986), a Portuguese agronomist, he researched Black pod disease
 José Hermano Saraiva (1919–2012), a Portuguese professor, historian, jurist and TV personality
 António Campos (1922–1999), a pioneer filmmaker of visual anthropology.
 António Cardoso e Cunha (1933–2021), politician, Govt. minister & first European Commissioner.
 António-Pedro Vasconcelos (born 1939), a Portuguese film director.
 Joaquim Justino Carreira (1950−2013), Bishop of the Roman Catholic Diocese of Guarulhos, Brazil.
 José António Vieira da Silva (born 1953), a Portuguese politician and Govt. minister, 2015-2019
 David Fonseca (born 1973), a musician, singer-songwriter and photographer.
 Rúben de Almeida Barbeiro (born 1987), known as KURA, an electro house music DJ and producer.

Sport 
 Rui António da Cruz Ferreira (born 1960), known as Nascimento, a retired footballer with 345 club caps
 Vânia Silva (born 1980), a female hammer thrower
 João Paulo Andrade (born 1981), a Portuguese footballer with over 380 club caps
 Rui Patrício (born 1988), a football goalkeeper with over 430 club caps and 97 for Portugal
 Irina Rodrigues (born 1991), a female discus thrower
 João Vieira (born 1991), a Portuguese footballer with over 250 club caps
 Ivan Domingues (born 2006), racing driver

See also 

 Centro Region, Portugal

References

External links

 Municipality of Leiria
 Mobilis Municipal Bus (in Portuguese)
 Portal of Leiria (Business and Social Network)
 Photos from Leiria
 2009 European Team Championships

 
Populated places in Leiria District
Cities in Portugal
Municipalities of Leiria District